Gordon Fleet (born 16 August 1945), known professionally as Snowy Fleet, is an English-born Australian drummer.

The Easybeats 

Born Gordon Fleet, he formed The Easybeats at the Villawood Migrant Hostel as the drummer. The group consisted of Gordon (now performing as “Snowy”), Stevie Wright (vocals/originally from Leeds, England), Georgie Young (guitar/from Glasgow, Scotland), Harry Vanda (guitar), and Dick Diamonde (bass, both from the Netherlands).

The Easybeats, often compared to the Beatles in popularity, had charting hits between 1966 and 1968, such as: "She's So Fine" (No. 3, 1965), "Wedding Ring" (No. 7, 1965), "Women (Make You Feel Alright)" (No. 4, 1966), "Come and See Her" (No. 3, 1966), "I'll Make You Happy" (No. 1, 1966), "Sorry" (No. 1, 1966)., "Friday on My Mind" (No. 1, 1966)<ref name="APRA Friday"></li>
From George Young (rock musician):  Note: For additional work, user may have to select 'Search again' and then 'Enter a title:' or 'Performer:'</ref> and "Heaven and Hell" (No. 8, 1967).

The band relocated from Australia to London in early 1966. There, they recorded their biggest selling hit “Friday on My Mind” in September that same year. Reaching number six on the British charts, it officially made the group an internationally successful band. 

Fleet left the Easybeats in the spring of 1967, as he was unhappy at the amount of time he had to spend away from his wife and young children, and was replaced by Tony Cahill. The Easybeats disbanded in 1969. A reunion took place in 1986, with the original members.

Fleet, with the group, was inducted into the ARIA Hall of Fame in 2005. He, Wright, and Vanda attended the ceremony. 

In 2017, it was announced that the Easybeats were getting their own miniseries, that would air on the Australian Broadcasting Company (ABC). The show ran for only two episodes. In the show, Snowy was portrayed by Arthur McBain.

Personal life 
In his later life, Fleet became a successful builder in Perth, Western Australia, and now runs a rehearsal studio based in Jandakot, Western Australia. 

Fleet was the only member of the Easybeats to attend the funeral of frontman Stevie Wright in January 2016.

Discography

Studio albums 

 Easy (1965)
 It's 2 Easy (1966)
 Volume 3 (1966)
 Good Friday / Friday on My Mind (1967)

References 

1945 births
Living people
British drummers
The Easybeats members